Uro or URO may refer to:

 Aurochs, the predecessor of modern cattle
 Uro Bonsai technique; see deadwood bonsai techniques
 Uro, Delta, Nigeria
 Uro (film), directed by Stefan Faldbakken
 Uro (trucks), a Spanish truck manufacturer
 Uromastyx, a genus of lizards
 Uros, a people of South America
 Uru–Chipaya languages, the family of languages spoken by the Uro people.
 United Restitution Organization, a legal aid service for victims of the Nazis
 Rouen Airport, of which URO is the IATA code
 Unified Repertoire and Ordering, an alternative name for the CJK Unified Ideographs (Unicode block).